Thyer is a surname. Notable people with the surname include:

Brad Thyer (born 1993), Welsh rugby union player 
Chris Thyer (born 1969), American lawyer and politician
Laura Thyer (born 1993), English Dressage rider
Mario Thyer (born 1966), Canadian ice hockey player
Robert Thyer (1709–1781), British writer and literary editor